Monte Roncalla is a mountain in Liguria, northern Italy, part of the Ligurian Apennines.

References

Mountains of Liguria
Mountains of Emilia-Romagna
One-thousanders of Italy
Mountains of the Apennines